Abdelrahman Mohamed may refer to:
 Abdelrahman El-Sayed (Abdelrahman Mohamed El-Sayed), Egyptian weightlifter
 Abdelrahman Mohamed (handballer), Egyptian handball player